Rafael Montero (born 9 October 1953 in Mexico City) is a film director and script writer known as one of the leaders of New Mexican Cinema. He is known for the feature films Cilantro y Perejil, El Costo de la Vida (The Cost of Life) y Corazones Rotos (Broken Hearts).

He has written and directed television programs, short films, commercials, documentaries and feature films. He has also participated as a judge and speaker at various festivals, competitions, conferences and seminars.

Early years 
Rafael Montero was born and spent his infancy in Colonia San Rafael in Mexico City. He was the son of Alicia García Betancourt and railroad engineer Rafael Montero Márquez.

Professional career 
El Costo de la Vida marked his debut as a screenwriter and director in the film industry by earning good results at the box office and with critics; it was nominated in several categories for the Silver Goddess Award and Ariel Award.

In the Nineties he directed the cult series La Hora Marcada (The Marked Hour) with well-known filmmakers Alfonso Cuarón, Guillermo del Toro and Emmanuel Lubezki.

Between 1990 and 1995 he directed five feature films including Una Buena Forma de Morir (A Good Way to Die) and Ya la Hicimos (We Already Did It), one of the highest-grossing films of 1993.

Cinematography

References

External links 
 
 https://web.archive.org/web/20120328092425/http://www2.eluniversal.com.mx/pls/impreso/noticia.html?id_nota=7571&tabla=espectaculos
 http://www.terra.com.mx/cine/articulo/975420/Rafael+Montero+expondra+las+intimidades+de+Pancho+Villa+en+filme.htm
 http://www.informador.com.mx/entretenimiento/2008/58280/6/relata-rafael-montero-en-nuevo-filme-las-formas-de-usar-la-cama.htm
 https://web.archive.org/web/20111007022902/http://sdpnoticias.com/nota/118310/Exponen_situacion_que_enfrenta_el_cine_en_Mexico_Espana_y_Colombia

Ariel Award winners
Best Director Ariel Award winners
Mexican film directors
People from Mexico City
1953 births
Living people